The Safe Is Cracked is a compilation album by Mobb Deep, released April 7, 2009.

Track listing

Charts

References

Mobb Deep albums
Albums produced by the Alchemist (musician)
Albums produced by Havoc (musician)
Hip hop compilation albums
2009 compilation albums
Gangsta rap compilation albums